Government Senior Secondary School Kot Beja (GSSS Kot Beja ) is a senior secondary school in Kot Beja Kasauli, Solan, Himachal Pradesh affiliated to Himachal Pradesh Board of School Education. It is situated at Kot Beja near Kasauli, District of Solan, Himachal Pradesh, INDIA
GSSS Kot Beja  offers academic programmes Up to secondary level leading to Arts since 2006 & also in Commerce since 2011  Institution is also introduced new job-oriented subjects i.e. Computer Science, Retail and Agriculture in sessions.

History 
The school was founded in 1946 as a Paathshala. At that time the school was in the fort of Beja State in Beja and then in 1966, it became a Government Primary School. It became a Government high School in 1985 and finally became Government Senior Secondary School in June 2006 after a long time .

Attributes

Difference Houses

Students development in all respects like: Moral education , Discipline etc. the students are divided into Three Houses named (i)(Gandhi) Mahatma Gandhi,(ii)(Vivekanand) Swami Vivekananda, (iii) (Tagour)Rabindranath Tagore

Mid Day Meal
According to the government's scheme Mid day meal (MDM)  the School provides meals to all children till 8th grade.

RTE
According to the RTE act the School provide free education, Books, uniform to students from 2010 and also formally expend the SSA and RSSA fund timely.

Other attributes
Sports  
Cultural & other activities 
scouts & guides
Eco Club

External links 
http://www.divyahimachal.com/himachal/baddi-solan-news/कोटबेजा-में-तनु-के-बोल-सबस/
http://www.veethi.com/schools-in-india/gsss-kot-beja-detail-1298272.htm
http://www.schoolsworld.in/schools/showschool.php?school_id=2090200901

High schools and secondary schools in Himachal Pradesh
Schools in Solan district
Educational institutions established in 1946
1946 establishments in India